In mathematics, a Coxeter group, named after H. S. M. Coxeter, is an abstract group that admits a  formal description in terms of reflections (or kaleidoscopic mirrors). Indeed, the finite Coxeter groups are precisely the finite Euclidean reflection groups; the symmetry groups of regular polyhedra are an example.  However, not all Coxeter groups are finite, and not all can be described in terms of symmetries and Euclidean reflections. Coxeter groups were introduced in 1934 as abstractions of reflection groups , and finite Coxeter groups were classified in 1935 .

Coxeter groups find applications in many areas of mathematics. Examples of finite Coxeter groups include the symmetry groups of  regular polytopes, and the Weyl groups of simple Lie algebras.  Examples of infinite Coxeter groups include the triangle groups corresponding to regular tessellations of the Euclidean plane and the hyperbolic plane, and the Weyl groups of infinite-dimensional Kac–Moody algebras.

Definition
Formally, a Coxeter group can be defined as a group with the  presentation

The condition  means no relation of the form  should be imposed.

The pair  where  is a Coxeter group with generators  is called a Coxeter system.

A number of conclusions can be drawn immediately from the above definition.
 The relation  means that  for all  ; as such the generators are involutions.
 If , then the generators  and  commute.  This follows by observing that
,
 together with

 implies that
.
Alternatively, since the generators are involutions, so , and thus is equal to the commutator.
 In order to avoid redundancy among the relations, it is necessary to assume that .  This follows by observing that
,
 together with

 implies that
.

Coxeter matrix and Schläfli matrix 
Indeed, every symmetric matrix with diagonal entries exclusively 1 and nondiagonal entries in the set  is a Coxeter matrix.

The Coxeter matrix can be conveniently encoded by a Coxeter diagram, as per the following rules.
 The vertices of the graph are labelled by generator subscripts.

In particular, two generators commute if and only if they are not connected by an edge.  
Furthermore, if a Coxeter graph has two or more connected components, the associated group is the direct product of the groups associated to the individual components.
Thus the disjoint union of Coxeter graphs yields a direct product of Coxeter groups.

The Coxeter matrix, is related to the  Schläfli matrix  with entries , but the elements are modified, being proportional to the dot product of the pairwise generators. The Schläfli matrix is useful because its eigenvalues determine whether the Coxeter group is of finite type (all positive), affine type (all non-negative, at least one zero), or indefinite type (otherwise). The indefinite type is sometimes further subdivided, e.g. into hyperbolic and other Coxeter groups. However, there are multiple non-equivalent definitions for hyperbolic Coxeter groups.

An example 
The graph  in which vertices 1 through n are placed in a row with each vertex connected by an unlabelled edge to its immediate neighbors gives rise to the symmetric group Sn+1; the generators correspond to the transpositions (1 2), (2 3), ... , (n n+1).  Two non-consecutive transpositions always commute, while (k k+1) (k+1 k+2) gives the 3-cycle (k k+2 k+1).  Of course, this only shows that Sn+1 is a quotient group of the Coxeter group described by the graph, but it is not too difficult to check that equality holds.

Connection with reflection groups 

Coxeter groups are deeply connected with reflection groups. Simply put, Coxeter groups are abstract groups (given via a presentation), while reflection groups are concrete groups (given as subgroups of linear groups or various generalizations).

The abstract group of a reflection group is a Coxeter group, while conversely a reflection group can be seen as a linear representation of a Coxeter group. For finite reflection groups, this yields an exact correspondence: every finite Coxeter group admits a faithful representation as a finite reflection group of some Euclidean space. For infinite Coxeter groups, however, a Coxeter group may not admit a representation as a reflection group.

Historically,  proved that every reflection group is a Coxeter group (i.e., has a presentation where all relations are of the form  or ), and indeed this paper introduced the notion of a Coxeter group, while  proved that every finite Coxeter group had a representation as a reflection group, and classified finite Coxeter groups.

Finite Coxeter groups

Classification 

The product of finitely many Coxeter groups in this list is again a Coxeter group, and all finite Coxeter groups arise in this way.

Weyl groups

Many, but not all of these, are Weyl groups, and every Weyl group can be realized as a Coxeter group.

This can be proven by comparing the restrictions on (undirected) Dynkin diagrams with the restrictions on Coxeter diagrams of finite groups: formally, the Coxeter graph can be obtained from the Dynkin diagram by discarding the direction of the edges, and replacing every double edge with an edge labelled 4 and every triple edge by an edge labelled 6. Also note that every finitely generated Coxeter group is an automatic group. Dynkin diagrams have the additional restriction that the only permitted edge labels are 2, 3, 4, and 6, which yields the above.

Note further that the (directed) Dynkin diagrams Bn and Cn give rise to the same Weyl group (hence Coxeter group), because they differ as directed graphs, but agree as undirected graphs – direction matters for root systems but not for the Weyl group; this corresponds to the hypercube and cross-polytope being different regular polytopes but having the same symmetry group.

Properties
Some properties of the finite irreducible Coxeter groups are given in the following table. The order of reducible groups can be computed by the product of their irreducible subgroup orders.

Symmetry groups of regular polytopes
All symmetry groups of regular polytopes are finite Coxeter groups.  Note that dual polytopes have the same symmetry group.

There are three series of regular polytopes in all dimensions. The symmetry group of a regular n-simplex is the symmetric group Sn+1, also known as the Coxeter group of type An.  The symmetry group of the n-cube and its dual, the n-cross-polytope, is Bn, and is known as the hyperoctahedral group.

The exceptional regular polytopes in dimensions two, three, and four, correspond to other Coxeter groups. In two dimensions, the dihedral groups, which are the symmetry groups of regular polygons, form the series I2(p). In three dimensions, the symmetry group of the regular dodecahedron and its dual, the regular icosahedron, is H3, known as the full icosahedral group.  In four dimensions, there are three special regular polytopes, the 24-cell, the 120-cell, and the 600-cell.  The first has symmetry group F4, while the other two are dual and have symmetry group H4.

The Coxeter groups of type Dn, E6, E7, and E8 are the symmetry groups of certain semiregular polytopes.

Affine Coxeter groups 

The affine Coxeter groups form a second important series of Coxeter groups.  These are not finite themselves, but each contains a normal abelian subgroup such that the corresponding quotient group is finite.  In each case, the quotient group is itself a Coxeter group, and the Coxeter graph of the affine Coxeter group is obtained from the Coxeter graph of the quotient group by adding another vertex and one or two additional edges.  For example, for n ≥ 2, the graph consisting of n+1 vertices in a circle is obtained from An in this way, and the corresponding Coxeter group is the affine Weyl group of An (the affine symmetric group).  For n = 2, this can be pictured as a subgroup of the symmetry group of the standard tiling of the plane by equilateral triangles.

In general, given a root system, one can construct the associated Stiefel diagram, consisting of the hyperplanes orthogonal to the roots along with certain translates of these hyperplanes. The affine Coxeter group (or affine Weyl group) is then the group generated by the (affine) reflections about all the hyperplanes in the diagram. The Stiefel diagram divides the plane into infinitely many connected components called alcoves, and the affine Coxeter group acts freely and transitively on the alcoves, just as the ordinary Weyl group acts freely and transitively on the Weyl chambers. The figure at right illustrates the Stiefel diagram for the  root system.

Suppose  is an irreducible root system of rank  and let  be a collection of simple roots. Let, also,  denote the highest root.

A list of the affine Coxeter groups follows:

The group symbol subscript is one less than the number of nodes in each case, since each of these groups was obtained by adding a node to a finite group's graph.

Hyperbolic Coxeter groups
There are infinitely many hyperbolic Coxeter groups describing reflection groups in hyperbolic space, notably including the hyperbolic triangle groups.

Partial orders
A choice of reflection generators gives rise to a length function ℓ on a Coxeter group, namely the minimum number of uses of generators required to express a group element; this is precisely the length in the word metric in the Cayley graph. An expression for v using ℓ(v) generators is a reduced word. For example, the permutation (13) in S3 has two reduced words, (12)(23)(12) and (23)(12)(23). The function  defines a map  generalizing the sign map for the symmetric group.

Using reduced words one may define three partial orders on the Coxeter group, the (right) weak order, the absolute order and the Bruhat order (named for François Bruhat). An element v exceeds an element u in the Bruhat order if some (or equivalently, any) reduced word for v contains a reduced word for u as a substring, where some letters (in any position) are dropped. In the weak order, v ≥ u if some reduced word for v contains a reduced word for u as an initial segment. Indeed, the word length makes this into a graded poset. The Hasse diagrams corresponding to these orders are objects of study, and are related to the Cayley graph determined by the generators.  The absolute order is defined analogously to the weak order, but with generating set/alphabet consisting of all conjugates of the Coxeter generators.

For example, the permutation (1 2 3) in S3 has only one reduced word, (12)(23), so covers (12) and (23) in the Bruhat order but only covers (12) in the weak order.

Homology 
Since a Coxeter group  is generated by finitely many elements of order 2, its abelianization is an elementary abelian 2-group, i.e., it is isomorphic to the direct sum of several copies of the cyclic group .

In all cases, the Schur multiplier is also an elementary abelian 2-group. For each infinite family  of finite or affine Weyl groups, the rank of  stabilizes as  goes to infinity.

See also
 Artin–Tits group
 Chevalley–Shephard–Todd theorem
 Complex reflection group
 Coxeter element
 Iwahori–Hecke algebra, a quantum deformation of the group algebra
 Kazhdan–Lusztig polynomial
 Longest element of a Coxeter group
 Supersolvable arrangement

Notes

References

Further reading

External links